Mrs. T's Pierogies is a mass market brand of pierogies in the United States. It is a product of Ateeco, Inc. based in Shenandoah, Pennsylvania.

The company was founded in 1952 by Ted Twardzik.  They make 14 varieties of pierogies and produce over 500 million pierogies per year. In the full sized pierogy, the varieties include; 4 Cheese Medley, 5 Cheese Pizza, American Cheese, Broccoli & Aged Chedder, Classic Cheddar, Classic Onion, Feta & Spinach, Garlic & Parmesan, Jalapeño & Sharp Cheddar, Loaded Baked Potato, Savory 5 Cheese Blend, Sour Cream and Chive, and, Traditional Sauerkraut.

The company promotes the Great Pierogi Race at home games of the Pittsburgh Pirates.

References

External links
 Website

American companies established in 1952
Food manufacturers of the United States
Companies based in Schuylkill County, Pennsylvania
1952 establishments in Pennsylvania
Food and drink companies established in 1952